Whatmough is a surname. Notable people with the surname include:

 Francis Whatmough (1856–1904), English cricketer
 Jack Whatmough (born 1996), English footballer